Mandi Haswell (born 1 October 1949) is a British diver. She competed in the women's 10 metre platform event at the 1968 Summer Olympics.

References

External links
 

1949 births
Living people
British female divers
Olympic divers of Great Britain
Divers at the 1968 Summer Olympics
Commonwealth Games competitors for Wales
Divers at the 1966 British Empire and Commonwealth Games
Sportspeople from Penarth